Hungary participated in the Eurovision Song Contest 2019. The local Media Services and Support Trust Fund (MTVA) and the Hungarian broadcaster Duna Media Service organised the national final  2019  in order to select the Hungarian entry for the 2019 contest in Tel Aviv, Israel. , this was Hungary's last entry in the contest, before the country withdrew the following year. The absence has continued in every edition since.

Background

Hungary's best placing in the contest was fourth, which they achieved with their début entry in 1994 with the song "" performed by Friderika Bayer. Hungary had attempted to participate in the contest in 1993, however, their entry was eliminated in the preselection show . Hungary withdrew from the contest for six years between 1999 and 2004 and also missed the 2006 and 2010 contests. In 2014, Hungary achieved their second-best result in the contest since their début, placing fifth with the song "Running" performed by András Kállay-Saunders. In 2016, Hungary placed 19th in the Eurovision final with the song "Pioneer" performed by Freddie. The following year they managed to finish in the top 10 again, now in the 8th place with "" sang by Joci Pápai. In 2018 hard rock-metal band AWS represented the country in Lisbon, and placed 21st in the grand final with ".

The Hungarian national broadcaster, Media Services and Support Trust Fund (MTVA), broadcasts the event within Hungary and organises the selection process for the nation's entry. MTVA confirmed their intentions to participate at the 2018 Eurovision Song Contest on 1 October 2018. Since 2012, MTVA has organised , a national selection show which has managed to, thus far, produce entries that have qualified the nation to the final of the Eurovision Song Contest each year and has resulted in three top 10 placings in 2013, 2014 and 2017.

Before Eurovision

A Dal 2019
 2019 was the eighth edition of the Hungarian national selection , which selected Hungary's entry for the Eurovision Song Contest 2019. The competition consisted of 30 entries competing in three heats, two semi-finals, and a final. The hosts are Bogi Dallos and Freddie. At the first press conference on 3 December 2018, MTVA announced the hosts, the jury, the 30 competing songs, and introduced the new logo of the show. The former symbol was in use since the inauguration of the contest, and every year they added the current year in the logo. The new one looks like a play button, or a plectrum, written in the inside A DAL 2019.

Format

Judges 
A jury panel consisted of four people:
 Feró Nagy: the lead singer of the Hungarian band Beatrice
 Lilla Vincze: the lead singer of the Hungarian band Napoleon Boulevard, was part of the Hungarian jury in the Eurovision Song Contest 2018
 Misi Mező: the lead singer and guitarist of the Hungarian band Magna Cum Laude
 Miklós Both: two times Fonogram-award winner performer and composer.

Competing entries

On 1 October 2018, MTVA opened the submission period for artists and composers to submit their entries up until 15 November 2018. One of the finalists, Petruska, was disqualified after MTVA alleged that his song was plagiarized.

Shows

Heats
Three heats took place on 19 January, 26 January and 2 February 2019. In each heat ten entries competed and six entries qualified to the semi-finals after two rounds of voting. In the first round of voting, five qualifiers were determined by the combination of scores from each judge and an aggregate score from a public SMS and mobile app vote. In the second round of voting, the remaining five entries that were not in the initial top five faced a public vote consisting of votes submitted through SMS in order to determine one additional qualifier.

In addition to the competing entries, other performers featured during the shows. Skorpió performed their song "" as the interval act in heat 1, Bill Deák Blues Band performed in heat 2, and Fecó Balázs performed in heat 3.

Semi-finals 
Two semi-finals took place on 9 and 16 February 2019. In each semi-final nine entries competed and four entries qualified to the final after two rounds of voting. In the first round of voting, three qualifiers were determined by the combination of scores from each judge and an aggregate score from a public SMS and mobile app vote. In the second round of voting, the remaining six entries that were not in the initial top three faced a public vote consisting of votes submitted through SMS in order to determine one additional qualifier. Following the semi-final, Petruska was disqualified after MTVA alleged that his song was plagiarised. He was replaced in the final by Gergő Oláh, who had originally been eliminated but who was awarded a wildcard.

In addition to the competing entries, other performers featured during the shows. Miklós Varga and his children performed as the interval act in semi-final 1, and Republic performed in semi-final 2.

Final 
The final took place on 23 February 2019 where the eight entries that qualified from the semi-finals competed. The winner of the competition was selected over two rounds of voting. In the first round, the jury determined the top four entries that would advance to the second round. The voting system for the four jurors was different from the method used in the heats and semi-finals. Each juror announced their scores after all songs had been performed rather than assigning scores following each performance and the jurors ranked their preferred top four entries and assigned points in the following manner: 4 (lowest), 6, 8 and 10 (highest). The four entries with the highest total scores proceeded to the second round. In the second round, "Az én apám" performed by Joci Pápai was selected as the winner via a public vote consisting of votes submitted through SMS, mobile app and online voting. In addition to the performances of the competing entries, guest performers included AWS, the winner of A Dal 2018 and representative of Hungary in the Eurovision Song Contest 2018.

At Eurovision 
According to Eurovision rules, all nations with the exceptions of the host country and the "Big Five" (France, Germany, Italy, Spain and the United Kingdom) are required to qualify from one of two semi-finals in order to compete for the final; the top ten countries from each semi-final progress to the final. The European Broadcasting Union (EBU) split up the competing countries into six different pots based on voting patterns from previous contests, with countries with favourable voting histories put into the same pot. On 28 January 2019, a special allocation draw was held which placed each country into one of the two semi-finals, as well as which half of the show they would perform in. Hungary was placed into the first semi-final, to be held on 14 May 2019, and was scheduled to perform in the first half of the show.

Once all the competing songs for the 2019 contest had been released, the running order for the semi-finals was decided by the shows' producers rather than through another draw, so that similar songs were not placed next to each other. Hungary was set to perform in position 7, following the entry from Czech Republic and preceding the entry from Belarus.

Semi-final
Hungary performed seventh in the first semi-final, following the entry from Czech Republic and preceding the entry from Belarus. At the end of the show, Hungary was not announced among the top 10 entries in the first semi-final and therefore failed to qualify to compete in the final. It was later revealed that Hungary placed twelfth in the semi-final, receiving a total of 97 points: 32 points from the televoting and 65 points from the juries, therefore missing out the final for the first time since 2010 when the country did not participate. With the old voting system, Hungary would have ranked 12th with 49 points.

Voting
Voting during the three shows involved each country awarding two sets of points from 1–8, 10 and 12: one from their professional jury and the other from televoting. Each nation's jury consisted of five music industry professionals who are citizens of the country they represent, with their names published before the contest to ensure transparency. This jury judged each entry based on: vocal capacity; the stage performance; the song's composition and originality; and the overall impression by the act. In addition, no member of a national jury was permitted to be related in any way to any of the competing acts in such a way that they cannot vote impartially and independently. The individual rankings of each jury member as well as the nation's televoting results will be released shortly after the grand final.

Points awarded to Hungary

Points awarded by Hungary

Detailed voting results
The following members comprised the Hungarian jury:
 Attila Borcsik (Izil; jury chairperson)head of music, DJ, music curator
  (Kiki)performer, singer
 singer, songwriter, lyricist, lead singer of the band Konyha
  (Lola)singer, presenter
 Alexandra Ivánsinger, songwriter, lyricist, lead singer of Ruby Harlem

References

External links 

2019
Countries in the Eurovision Song Contest 2019
Eurovision